Events in the year 2023 in El Salvador.

Incumbents 

 President: Nayib Bukele
 Vice President: Félix Ulloa

Events 
Ongoing — COVID-19 pandemic in El Salvador

Holidays 
 1 January — New Year's Day
 10 May – Mother's Day
 17 June – Father's Day
 4–6 August — August Festivals, including Feast of San Salvador
 15 September – Independence Day, anniversary of the Act of Independence of Central America.
 2 November – Day of the Dead

Deaths 
 6 January — Sigifredo Ochoa, 80, military officer and politician, deputy (2012–2015).

References 

 

 
2020s in El Salvador
Years of the 21st century in El Salvador
El Salvador
El Salvador